Yamagishi is a Japanese surname. Notable people with the surname include:

, Japanese trade unionist
, Japanese bodybuilder
, Japanese long-distance runner
, Japanese diver
, Japanese tennis player
, Japanese guitarist
, Japanese footballer
, Japanese manga artist
, Japanese footballer
, Japanese photo editor and curator
Teruaki Yamagishi, Japanese businessman

See also
Yamagishi movement, an egalitarian community

Japanese-language surnames